SP140 nuclear body protein like is a protein that in humans is encoded by the SP140L gene.

References

Further reading